Camping is a recreational activity.

Camping may also refer to:

Activities
 Summer camping, an American children's activity
 Backpacking (hiking), hiking and camping overnight in backcountry

Computing and Internet
 Camping (microframework), a microframework for writing web applications in Ruby

Entertainment and media

Films
 Camping (1917 film), an American silent film with Victor Moore
 Camping (1978 film), a Dutch film by Thijs Chanowski
 Camping (1990 film), a Danish film with Søren Pilmark, Per Pallesen and Rolv Wesenlund
 Camping (2006 film), a French film by Fabien Onteniente
 Camping (2009 film), a Danish film with Mia Lyhne and Kirsten Lehfeldt

Games
 Camping (game), a team ball game played in Medieval England, a forerunner of football
 Camping (video games), staying in one spot with a tactical advantage in a computer or video game

Music
 "Camping", a song included on the CD Disney Children's Favorite Songs 4

Television
 Camping (UK TV series)
 Camping (U.S. TV series)
 Camping (Parks and Recreation), a 2011 third-season episode of the comedy series Parks and Recreation
 "Camping", an episode of the television series Teletubbies

People
 Harold Camping (1921–2013), Christian radio preacher

Places
 Camping, used in most European countries as a loanword to mean campsite

Telecommunications
 A feature on a private branch exchange telephone system

See also
 Camp (disambiguation)
 CAMP (disambiguation)
 Camper (disambiguation)